Deh Now-e Karam Ali (also Romanized as Deh Now-e Karam ‘Alī; also known as Dehnow and Deh Now Alashtar) is a village in Khaveh-ye Shomali Rural District, in the Central District of Delfan County, Lorestan Province, Iran. At the 2006 census, its population was 48, in 9 families.

References 

Towns and villages in Delfan County